Morpheus is the second studio album by Canadian industrial/electronic music group Delerium in 1989.

Track listing

Personnel 
Delerium
Rhys Fulber – instruments, production
Bill Leeb – instruments, production
Production and additional personnel
Carylann Loeppky – photography
Anthony Valcic – mixing

References

External links 
 

Delerium albums
1989 albums
Albums produced by Rhys Fulber